is a town located in Akita Prefecture, Japan. , the town had an estimated population of 4,646 in 2,368 households, and a population density 23 persons per km². In 2016, Kosaka was selected as one of The Most Beautiful Villages in Japan.

Geography
Kosaka is located in the Ōu Mountains the mountains of far northeastern Akita Prefecture, with Aomori Prefecture on the north, and Lake Towada to the northeast. Much of the town is within the borders of the Towada-Hachimantai National Park. Much of the town area is covered in forest. Due to its inland location, the town is noted for its heavy snowfall in winter.

Neighboring municipalities
Akita Prefecture
Kazuno
Ōdate
Aomori Prefecture
Hirakawa
Towada

Demographics
Per Japanese census data, the population of Kosaka has declined by more than two-thirds since 1960.

Climate
Kosaka has a cold Humid continental climate characterized by cool short summers and long cold winters with heavy snowfall and (Köppen climate classification Dfa).  The average annual temperature in Kosaka is 8.4 °C. The average annual rainfall is 1466 mm with September as the wettest month. The temperatures are highest on average in August, at around 22.2 °C, and lowest in January, at around -4.3 °C.

History
The area of present-day Kosaka was part of ancient Mutsu Province and was ruled by the Nambu clan of Morioka Domain during the Edo period. The “Kosaka-kaido” highway connecting Morioka Domain with Hirosaki Domain passed through Kosaka. Under the Nambu, major deposits of gold and silver were mined by the Fujita-gumi, the predecessor to modern Dowa Holdings for the Nambu clan at the Kosaka mine. After the start of the Meiji period, the area became briefly part of Rikuchū Province before being transferred to Akita Prefecture in 1871. It was organized as part of Kazuno District, Akita Prefecture in 1878. The village of Kosaka was created with the establishment of the modern municipalities system on April 1, 1889. It was raised to town status on May 12, 1914.

Economy
With the depletion of the mineral deposits at the Kosaka Mine from the 1990s, the economy of Kosaka is now largely based on agriculture, forestry and seasonal tourism. Dowa Holdings, the owner of the Kosaka Mine is active in the metal recycling industry. In terms of light manufacturing, the Towada Audio Corporation, a manufacturer of shortwave radio sets, TV tuners and AC adapters in the Sony group, is based in Kosaka.

Education
Kosaka has one public elementary school and one public middle school operated by the town government and one public high school operated by the Akita Prefectural Board of Education.

Transportation

Railway
The Kosaka Smelting & Refining Kosaka Line provided passenger services until 1994. At present, the town is not served by any passenger railway line.

Highway

Local attractions

Former head offices of Kosaka mine (National Important Cultural Property)
Koraku-kan - the oldest operating, traditional Kabuki theatre in Japan. The Koraku-kan was made of all wood in 1910, and is stylistically a mix of western and traditional Japanese architecture. It was designated as an Important Cultural Property in 2002.
Lake Towada 
Nanataki Falls – one of the Japan's Top 100 Waterfalls
 Akita Inaka language school (since 2019)

External links

Official Website 
Akita Inaka Language School

References

 
Towns in Akita Prefecture